The KT88 is a beam tetrode/kinkless tetrode (hence "KT") vacuum tube for audio amplification.

Features 
The KT88 fits a standard eight-pin octal socket and has similar pinout and applications as the 6L6 and EL34. Specifically designed for audio amplification, the KT88 has higher plate power and voltage ratings than the American 6550. It is one of the largest tubes in its class and can handle significantly higher plate voltages than similar tubes, up to 800 volts. A KT88 push-pull pair in class AB1 fixed bias is capable of 100 watts of output with 2.5% total harmonic distortion or up to about 50W at low distortion in hi-fi applications. The transmitting tubes TT21 and TT22 have almost identical transfer characteristics to KT88 but a different pinout, and by virtue of their anode being connected to the top cap have a higher plate voltage rating (1.25 kilovolt) and a higher power output capability of 200 watts in class AB1 push–pull.

The screen grid is sometimes tied to the anode so that it becomes effectively a triode with a lower maximum power output.

History 
The KT88 was introduced by GEC in 1956 as a larger variant of the KT66. It was manufactured in the U.K. by the MOV (Marconi-Osram Valve) subsidiary of G.E.C, also labelled as IEC/Mullard, and, in the U.S., Genalex Gold Lion. 

As of 2022, KT88 valves are produced by New Sensor Corporation (Genalex Gold Lion and Electro-Harmonix brands) in Saratov, Russia, JJ Electronic in Čadca, Slovakia and  Hengyang Electronics (Psvane brand) at former Guiguang factory in Foshan, China. 

NOS examples in good condition are extremely rare. Due to its availability and characteristics, the KT88 is popular in hi-fi production amplifiers.

Historically, it has been far more popular with high fidelity stereo manufacturers than guitar amplifier builders, given its characteristics of high-power and low-distortion.  Due to these characteristics, it is regularly used to replace 6550 tubes by end users seeking a guitar amplifier tone with less distortion. Some of the amplifiers which shipped with the KT88 power tube include the Hiwatt, Marshall Major, and some Ampeg models.

Characteristics

See also
 KT66
 KT90
 6L6
 6CA7 / EL34
 6V6
 807

References

External links
 Reviews of KT88 tubes.
 Tube Data Archive, thousands of tube data sheets

Vacuum tubes
Guitar amplification tubes
Audiovisual introductions in 1956